Anna of Saxony (5 June 1420 – 17 September 1462, Spangenberg) was a princess of Saxony and by marriage landgravine of Hesse.

Life 
Anna was the eldest daughter of the elector Frederick I of Saxony (1370–1428) from his marriage to Catherine (1395–1442), daughter of Duke Henry I "the Mild" of Brunswick-Lüneburg.

Anna, with a dowry of 19,000 Rhenish gold florins, married on 8 September 1433 in Kassel Landgrave Louis I of Hesse.  Their engagement had been announced on the occasion of the Inheritance Treaty between the two houses in 1431 in Rotenburg an der Fulda.  Through this marriage, Louis increased his territory considerably.  He received the Saxon properties of Eschwege and Sontra from Anna's brother Frederick II of Saxony.  Frederick II also renounced his rights to Wanfried.

Offspring 
From her marriage to Louis, Anna had the following children:
 Louis II (1438–1471), Landgrave of Hesse
 married in 1454 Countess Mechthild of Württemberg (1438-1495)
 Henry III (1440–1483), Landgrave of Hesse-Marburg
 married Countess Anna of Katzenelnbogen (1443-1494)
 Hermann (1449–1508), 1480-1508 Archbishop of Cologne
 Elisabeth (1453–1489), known as the Beautiful
 married in 1464 Count John III of Nassau-Weilburg (1441-1480)
 Frederick (1458–1463)

References 
 Karl Wilhelm Böttiger: History of the Electorate and Kingdom of Saxony, p. 378
 Carl Lorenz Collmann: History of the old town of Sontra in Lower Hesse, p. 28
 Karl Florentin Leidenfrost: Elector Frederick II and his brothers, Duke Sigismund and Duke William ..., p. 31

House of Wettin
1420 births
1462 deaths
Landgravines of Hesse
15th-century German women
15th-century German people
Daughters of monarchs